Theodora of Alexandria was a saint and Desert Mother who was married to a prefect of Egypt. In order to perform penance for adultery, she disguised herself as a man and, pretending to be a eunuch, joined a monastery in the Thebaid. Her true identity as a woman was discovered only after her death.

A rare image of Theodora in Western art is a print by Bernardino Capitelli, made in 1627 for Theodora Costa dal Pozzo, showing the saint disguised as a monk and caring for the child she was accused of fathering (Vienna: Graphische Sammlung Albertina).

Theodora is honored with a Lesser Feast (with Sarah, and Syncletica) on the liturgical calendar of the Episcopal Church in the United States of America on 5 January.

References

Eastern Orthodox saints
Late Ancient Christian female saints
5th-century Christian saints
5th-century Byzantine people
Byzantine female saints
Cross-dressing saints
Ancient Alexandrians
Saints from Roman Egypt
Byzantine saints
5th-century Byzantine women
5th-century Egyptian people
5th-century Egyptian women

Anglican saints